Mangalya Bhagyam is a 1958 Indian Tamil-language film directed by T. R. Raghunath and produced by Lena Chettiar. The film featured K. Balaji and Ragini in the lead roles.

Cast 
The following list was adapted from the database of Film News Anandan.

Male cast
K. Balaji
T. S. Balaiah
T. K. Ramachandran
O. A. K. Thevar
K. A. Thangavelu

Female cast
Ragini
T. D. Kusalakumari
Padmini
M. Saroja
M. N. Rajam

Dance
Saayee and Subbulakshmi

Production 
The film was produced by Lakshmanan, popularly known as Lena Chettiar under his own banner Krishna Pictures and was directed by T. R. Raghunath. The screenplay and dialogues were written by Ayya Pillai. Sampath and Rahuman handled the Cinematography while the editing was done by V. P. Natarajan. Angamuthu was in charge of art direction. Choreography was done by Chinni-Sampath and Stunt was handled by R. N. Nambiar. The film was shot at Vauhini and Neptune studios.

Soundtrack 
Music was composed by G. Ramanathan, while the lyrics were penned by Udumalai Narayana Kavi, Thanjai N. Ramaiah Dass and Kannadasan. Playback singers are Sirkazhi Govindarajan, S. C. Krishnan, M. L. Vasanthakumari, K. Jamuna Rani, A. G. Rathnamala, A. P. Komala, P. Leela and P. Susheela.

References

External links

Films scored by G. Ramanathan
Films directed by T. R. Raghunath